D. Antão Vaz de Almada (c. 1573 – 17 December 1644) is a Portuguese national hero due to his involvement in the Restoration of Independence in 1640, as one of the Forty Conspirators. During the coup d'état, he was responsible for the arrest of the Duchess of Mantua, then the Vicereine of Portugal.

In 1641-42, he was sent as ambassador to England to secure the recognition of Portugal's independence abroad.

Antão de Almada was the 7th holder of the title of Count of Avranches by virtue of inheritance under the salic law, even though he did not make use of it.

References

1570s births
1644 deaths
Ambassadors of Portugal to the Kingdom of England
Commanders of the Order of Christ (Portugal)
17th-century Portuguese military personnel
Portuguese military commanders of the Portuguese Restoration War
Portuguese nobility